Agnes Griffith (6 March 1969 – 25 February 2015) was a Grenadian sprinter. She competed in the women's 200 metres at the 1988 Summer Olympics.

References

External links
 

1969 births
2015 deaths
Athletes (track and field) at the 1988 Summer Olympics
Grenadian female sprinters
Olympic athletes of Grenada
Place of birth missing
Olympic female sprinters